Amédée Baillot de Guerville, or A.B. de Guerville (1869–1913), was a free-lance war correspondent, editor, and commercial agent, most frequently cited for his travel writing. He was best known in his day for his staunch defense of Japan in the aftermath of the  Port Arthur Massacre of November 1894.

A.B. de Guerville was born the son of Paul-Louis-Amédée Baillot, clerk, commercial agent, and teacher of the French language, and his third wife, Antoinette Luce. He immigrated to the United States from his native France in 1887.

De Guerville began teaching French at Milwaukee Women's College in 1889. In 1890 he established the Le Courrier Francais newspaper for the Milwaukee and Chicago francophone community. Baillot began his career as commercial agent in 1891 with a stereopticon presentation of the 1889 Exposition Universelle de Paris (Paris World's Fair) to an audience in St. Paul, Minnesota. In 1892 de Guerville traveled to Japan, Korea, China, Ceylon, and Europe as a Special Commissioner for the World Columbian Exposition (the Chicago World's Fair) of 1893, where he promoted the event to kings, emperors, and heads of state.

In 1894 de Guerville returned to Asia, banking on contacts he had made during the brief time he spent there in 1892 to secure an assignment as special correspondent covering the Sino-Japanese War, then known simply as the China-Japan War, for the New York Herald under the direction of James Gordon Bennett, Jr. His primary competition was James Creelman, writing for The New York World. Creelman and Baillot came to journalistic blows regarding the massacre of Chinese civilians by Japanese troops at the Chinese city of Port Arthur on November 20–21, 1894. While Creelman, and other correspondents present, described a widescale and cold-blooded massacre, de Guerville alleged in the pages of the New York Herald that no such massacre had occurred.

In 1898, de Guerville became part-owner and manager of The Illustrated American, a New York monthly periodical. The offices of the journal were gutted by fire in 1899 and shortly thereafter, but not necessarily as a result of the fire, de Guerville left the United States for his native France never to return. In his version of events, the onset of a heretofore latent tuberculosis was the cause of his departure. By his own account, de Guerville experienced a near miraculous recovery from his tuberculosis while a patient at the pioneering Nordach Clinic for consumptives in Germany's Black Forest region. Thereafter he continued to travel and write for a short while, producing his memoirs of his experiences in the Far East entitled Au Japon (1904), in which he admitted that the massacre had occurred while insisting it was Japanese coolies who had done the butchering. He also wrote a well-received travelogue of British Egypt entitled New Egypt (1906). While in Egypt in 1906, A.B. de Guerville claimed to be the first man to race up the Nile in his motor-boat.  In the last years of his life de Guerville was reported to have lived in  Lausanne, Switzerland. During these latter years he also purchased land from in Valecluse in the south of France, where he is credited with developing the land and expanding their golf course. He died in 1913, likely of the tuberculosis from which he claimed to have been cured. He is buried in the Alphonse Karr Cemetery in Saint-Raphaël, France.

De Guerville married Laura Belle Spraker, scion of a well-established New York family, in 1896 in New York City. In 1900 Mrs. A.B. de Guerville filed for bankruptcy and divorce.

Notes

References
Guerville, A.B. de. The Crusade Against Phthisis." London: Hugh Rees, 1904.
Guerville, A.B. de. Au Japon: The Memoirs of a Foreign Correspondent in Japan, Korea, and China, 1892-1894. Edited and with an Introduction by Daniel C. Kane. West Lafayette, IN: Parlor Press, 2009.
Kane, Daniel C. "Each of Us in His Own Way: Factors Behind Conflicting Accounts of the Massacre at Port Arthur." Journalism History'' 31.1 (Spring 2005):23-33.

External links
 
 

1869 births
American male journalists
1913 deaths
French emigrants to the United States
Place of birth missing